Mouse Blood was intended to be Theatre of Ice's final offering as brothers Brent and John moved to Utah to attend college at Brigham Young University and brothers Eric and Mark departed on missions for the Church of Jesus Christ of Latter-day Saints in Georgia and Connecticut. Labeled as "A limited edition sampling of the works of Theatre of Ice as chosen by friends who hate the band" it included songs from their first three albums as well as a few new releases. The album, however, was heralded by the music press as one of the most innovative albums of the decade.

Musicians 

Brent Johnson - Vocals, Guitars & Effects
John Johnson - Guitar, Synthesizer & Keyboards
Mark Johnson - Drums & Things
Eric Johnson - Guitar, Continuity

Track listing
It's All Over Now
Driven
Fox
Just Let It Go
A Cool Dark Place To Die
The Burning Man
The Last
Starlight Drive
Watch The Skies
Chill Factor
In The Burning Church
One Two
From the Ruins of my Mind
Miron
Beneath the Stones
Life is a Circus

Notes 

1985 albums
Demented Mind Mill Records albums
Theatre of Ice albums